The 2016 Elon Phoenix football team represented Elon University in the 2016 NCAA Division I FCS football season. They were led by third-year head coach Rich Skrosky and played their home games at Rhodes Stadium. They were members of the Colonial Athletic Association (CAA). They finished the season 2–9, 1–7 in CAA play to finish in a tie for 11th place.

On December 20, 2016 Rich Skrosky resigned after accepting a coaching job at FIU. He finished at Elon with a record of 7–27.

Schedule

Game summaries

Gardner–Webb

at Charlotte

Fayetteville State

at William & Mary

Villanova

New Hampshire

Richmond

at Albany

at Towson

Rhode Island

at James Madison

References

Elon
Elon Phoenix football seasons
Elon Phoenix football